

A 
 V62.3 Academic Problem 
 V62.4 Acculturation Problem 
 308.3 Acute Stress Disorder 
 Adjustment Disorders
 309.9  Unspecified Adjustment Reaction NOS
 309.24 With Anxiety 
 309.0 With Depressed Mood 
 309.3 With Disturbance of Conduct 
 309.28 With Mixed Anxiety and Depressed Mood 
 309.4 With Mixed Disturbance of Emotions and Conduct 
 V71.01 Adult Antisocial Behavior
 995.2 Adverse Effects of Medication NOS 
 780.93 Age-Related Cognitive Decline 
 300.22 Agoraphobia Without History of Panic Disorder
 Alcohol
 305.00 Abuse 
 303.90 Dependence 
 291.89 -Induced Anxiety Disorder 
 291.89 -Induced Mood Disorder 
 291.1 -Induced Persisting Amnestic Disorder 
 291.2 -Induced Persisting Dementia 
 291.5 -Induced Psychotic Disorder, With Delusions 
 291.3 -Induced Psychotic Disorder, With Hallucinations 
 291.89 -Induced Sexual Dysfunction 
 291.89 -Induced Sleep Disorder 
 303.00 Intoxication 
 291.0 Intoxication Delirium 
 291.9 -Related Disorder NOS 
 291.81 Withdrawal
 291.0 Withdrawal Delirium 
 Amnestic Disorder
 294.0 Amnestic Disorder Due to...[Indicate the General Medical Condition] 
 294.8 Amnestic Disorder NOS
 Amphetamine (or Amphetamine-Like)
 305.70 Abuse 
 304.40 Dependence 
 292.89 -Induced Anxiety Disorder 
 292.84 -Induced Mood Disorder 
 292.11 -Induced Psychotic Disorder, With Delusions 
 292.12 -Induced Psychotic Disorder, With Hallucinations 
 292.89 -Induced Sexual Dysfunction 
 292.89 -Induced Sleep disorder 
 292.89 Intoxication 
 292.81 Intoxication Delirium 
 292.9 -Related Disorder NOS 
 292.0 Withdrawal
 307.1 Anorexia Nervosa 
 301.7 Antisocial Personality Disorder 
 Anxiety Disorder
 293.84 Anxiety Disorder Due to...[Indicate the General Medical Condition] 
 300.00 Anxiety Disorder NOS 
 299.80 Asperger's Disorder 
 Attention-Deficit Hyperactivity Disorder
 314.01 Combined Type 
 314.01 Predominantly Hyperactive-Impulsive Type 
 314.00 Predominantly Inattentive Type
 314.9 Attention-Deficit Hyperactivity Disorder NOS 
 299.00 Autistic Disorder 
 301.82 Avoidant Personality Disorder 
Top

B 

 V62.82 Bereavement 
 Bipolar Disorder
 296.80 Bipolar Disorder NOS
 Bipolar I Disorder, Most Recent Episode Depressed
 296.56 In Full Remission 
 296.55 In Partial Remission 
 296.51 Mild 
 296.52 Moderate 
 296.53 Severe Without Psychotic Features 
 296.54 Severe With Psychotic Features 
 296.50 Unspecified 
 296.40 Bipolar I Disorder, Most Recent Episode Hypomanic 
 Bipolar Disorder I, Most Recent Episode Manic
 296.46 In Full Remission 
 296.45 In Partial Remission 
 296.41 Mild 
 296.42 Moderate 
 296.43 Severe Without Psychotic Features 
 296.44 Severe With Psychotic Features 
 296.40 Unspecified 
 Bipolar Disorder I, Most Recent Episode Mixed
 296.66 In Full Remission
 296.65 In Partial Remission 
 296.61 Mild 
 296.62 Moderate 
 296.63 Severe Without Psychotic Features 
 296.64 Severe With Psychotic Features 
 296.60 Unspecified 
 296.7 Bipolar I Disorder, Most Recent Episode Unspecified
 Bipolar I Disorder, Single Manic Episode
 296.06 In Full Remission 
 296.05 In Partial Remission 
 296.01 Mild 
 296.02 Moderate 
 296.03 Severe Without Psychotic Features 
 296.04 Severe With Psychotic Features 
 296.00 Unspecified 
 296.89 Bipolar II Disorder 
 300.7 Body Dysmorphic Disorder 
 V62.89 Borderline Intellectual Functioning 
 301.83 Borderline Personality Disorder 
 780.59 Breathing-Related Sleep Disorder 
 298.8 Brief Psychotic Disorder 
 307.51 Bulimia Nervosa 
Top

C 

 Caffeine
 292.89 -Induced Anxiety Disorder 
 292.89 -Induced Sleep Disorder 
 305.90 Intoxication 
 292.9 -Related Disorder NOS 
 Cannabis
 305.20 Abuse 
 304.30 Dependence 
 292.89 -Induced Anxiety Disorder 
 292.11 -Induced Psychotic Disorder, With Delusions 
 292.12 -Induced Psychotic Disorder, With Hallucinations 
 292.89 Intoxication 
 292.81 Intoxication Delirium 
 292.9 -Related Disorder NOS 
 293.89 Catatonic Disorder Due to...[Indicate the General Medical Condition] 
 299.10 Childhood Disintegrative Disorder 
 V71.02 Child or Adolescent Antisocial Behavior 
 307.22 Chronic Motor or Vocal Tic Disorder 
 307.45 Circadian Rhythm Sleep Disorder 
 Cocaine
 305.60 Abuse 
 304.20 Dependence 
 292.89 -Induced Anxiety Disorder 
 292.84 -Induced Mood Disorder 
 292.11 -Induced Psychotic Disorder, With Delusions 
 292.12 -Induced Psychotic Disorder, With Hallucinations 
 292.89 -Induced Sexual Dysfunction 
 292.89 -Induced Sleep Disorder 
 292.89 Intoxication 
 292.81 Intoxication Delirium 
 292.9 -Related Disorder NOS 
 292.0 Withdrawal
 294.9 Cognitive Disorder NOS 
 307.9 Communication Disorder NOS 
 Conduct Disorder
 312.81 Childhood-onset type
 312.82 Adolescent-onset type
 312.89 Unspecified type
 300.11 Conversion Disorder 
 301.13 Cyclothymic Disorder 
Top

D 

 Delirium
 293.0 Delirium Due to...[Indicate the General Medical Condition] 
 780.09 Delirium NOS 
 297.1 Delusional Disorder 
 Dementia due to Creutzfeldt–Jakob disease 
 294.10 Without behavioral disturbance
 294.11 With behavioral disturbance
 Dementia Due to Head Trauma 
 294.10 Without behavioral disturbance
 294.11 With behavioral disturbance
 Dementia Due to HIV Disease
 294.10 Without behavioral disturbance
 294.11 With behavioral disturbance
 Dementia Due to Huntington's Disease 
 294.10 Without behavioral disturbance
 294.11 With behavioral disturbance
 Dementia Due to Parkinson's Disease 
 294.10 Without behavioral disturbance
 294.11 With behavioral disturbance
 Dementia Due to Pick's Disease
 294.10 Without behavioral disturbance
 294.11 With behavioral disturbance
 Dementia Due to... [Indicate Other General Medical Condition]
 294.10 Without behavioral disturbance
 294.11 With behavioral disturbance
 294.8 Dementia NOS 
 Dementia of the Alzheimer's Type, With Early Onset
 294.10 Without behavioral disturbance
 294.11 With behavioral disturbance
 Dementia of the Alzheimer's Type, With Late Onset
 294.10 Without behavioral disturbance
 294.11 With behavioral disturbance
 301.6 Dependent Personality Disorder 
 300.6 Depersonalization Disorder 
 311 Depressive Disorder NOS 
 315.4 Developmental Coordination Disorder 
 799.9 Diagnosis Deferred on Axis II 
 799.9 Diagnosis or Condition Deferred on Axis I 
 313.9 Disorder of Infancy, Childhood, or Adolescence NOS 
 315.2 Disorder of Written Expression 
 312.9 Disruptive Behavior Disorder NOS 
 300.12 Dissociative Amnesia 
 300.15 Dissociative Disorder NOS 
 300.13 Dissociative Fugue 
 300.14 Dissociative Identity Disorder 
 302.76 Dyspareunia (Not Due to a General Medical Condition) 
 307.47 Dyssomnia NOS 
 300.4 Dysthymic Disorder 
Top

E 

 307.50 Eating Disorder NOS 
 Encopresis
 787.6 Encopresis, With Constipation and Overflow Incontinence 
 307.7 Encopresis, Without Constipation and Overflow Incontinence 
 307.6 Enuresis (Not Due to a General Medical Condition) 
 302.4 Exhibitionism 
 315.31 Expressive Language Disorder 
Top

F 

 Factitious Disorder
 300.19 With Combined Psychological and Physical Signs and Symptoms 
 300.19 With Predominantly Physical Signs and Symptoms 
 300.16 With Predominantly Psychological Signs and Symptoms 
 300.19 Factitious Disorder NOS 
 307.59 Feeding Disorder of Infancy or Early Childhood 
 625.0 Female Dyspareunia Due to...[Indicate the General Medical Condition] 
 625.8 Female Hypoactive Sexual Desire Disorder Due to...[Indicate the General Medical Condition] 
 302.73 Female Orgasmic Disorder 
 302.72 Female Sexual Arousal Disorder 
 302.81 Fetishism 
 302.89 Frotteurism 
Top

G 
Gender Identity Disorder
 302.85 in Adolescents or Adults 
 302.6 in Children 
 302.6 Gender Identity Disorder NOS 
 300.02 Generalized Anxiety Disorder 
Top

H 
Hallucinogen
 305.30 Abuse 
 304.50 Dependence 
 292.89 -Induced Anxiety Disorder 
 292.84 -Induced Mood Disorder
 292.11 -Induced Psychotic Disorder, With Delusions 
 292.12 -Induced Psychotic Disorder, With Hallucinations 
 292.89 Intoxication 
 292.81 Intoxication Delirium 
 292.89 Persisting Perception Disorder 
 292.9 -Related Disorder NOS 
 301.50 Histrionic Personality Disorder 
 307.44 Hypersomnia related to...[Indicate the Axis I or Axis II Disorder] 
 302.71 Hypoactive Sexual Desire Disorder 
 300.7 Hypochondriasis 
Top

I 

 313.82 Identity Problem 
 312.30 Impulse-Control Disorder NOS 
 Inhalant
 305.90 Abuse 
 304.60 Dependence 
 292.89 -Induced Anxiety Disorder 
 292.84 -Induced Mood Disorder 
 292.82 -Induced Persisting Dementia 
 292.11 -Induced Psychotic Disorder, With Delusions 
 292.12 -Induced Psychotic Disorder, With Hallucinations 
 292.89 Intoxication 
 292.81 Intoxication Delirium 
 292.9 -Related Disorder NOS 
 307.42 Insomnia Related to...[Indicate the Axis I or Axis II Disorder] 
 312.34 Intermittent Explosive Disorder 
Top

K 

 312.32 Kleptomania 
Top

L 

 315.9 Learning Disorder NOS 
Top

M 

 Major Depressive Disorder
 Major Depressive Disorder, Recurrent
 296.36 In Full Remission 
 296.35 In Partial Remission 
 296.31 Mild 
 296.32 Moderate 
 296.33 Severe Without Psychotic Features 
 296.34 Severe With Psychotic Features 
 296.30 Unspecified 
 Major Depressive Disorder, Single Episode
 296.26 In Full Remission 
 296.25 In Partial Remission 
 296.21 Mild 
 296.22 Moderate 
 296.23 Severe Without Psychotic Features 
 296.24 Severe With Psychotic Features 
 296.20 Unspecified 
 608.89 Male Dyspareunia Due to...[Indicate the General Medical Condition] 
 302.72 Male Erectile Disorder 
 607.84 Male Erectile Disorder Due to...[Indicate the General Medical Condition] 
 608.89 Male Hypoactive Sexual Desire Disorder Due to...[Indicate the General Medical Condition] 
 302.74 Male Orgasmic Disorder 
 V65.2 Malingering 
 315.1 Mathematics Disorder 
 Medication-Induced
 333.90 Movement Disorder NOS 
 333.1 Postural Tremor 
 293.9 Mental Disorder NOS Due to...[Indicate the General Medical Condition] 
 Mental Retardation
 319 Mental Retardation, Severity Unspecified 
 317 Mild Mental Retardation 
 318.0 Moderate Mental Retardation 
 315.31 Mixed Receptive-Expressive Language Disorder 
 Mood Disorder
 293.83 Mood Disorder Due to...[Indicate the General Medical Condition] 
 296.90 Mood Disorder NOS 
Top

N 

 301.81 Narcissistic Personality Disorder 
 347 Narcolepsy 
 Neglect of Child
 V61.21 Neglect of Child 
 995.5 Neglect of Child (if focus of attention is on victim) 
 Neuroleptic-Induced
 333.99 Acute Akathisia 
 333.7 Acute Dystonia 
 332.1 Parkinsonism
 333.82 Tardive Dyskinesia 
 333.92 Neuroleptic Malignant Syndrome 
 Nicotine
 305.1 Dependence 
 292.9 -Related Disorder NOS 
 292.0 Withdrawal 
 307.47 Nightmare Disorder 
 V71.09 No Diagnosis on Axis II 
 V71.09 No Diagnosis or Condition on Axis I 
 V15.81 Noncompliance With Treatment 
Top

O 

 300.3 Obsessive-Compulsive Disorder 
 301.4 Obsessive-Compulsive Personality Disorder 
 V62.2 Occupational Problem 
 Opioid
 305.50 Abuse 
 304.00 Dependence
 292.84 -Induced Mood Disorder 
 292.11 -Induced Psychotic Disorder, With Delusions 
 292.12 -Induced Psychotic Disorder, With Hallucinations 
 292.85 -Induced Sleep Disorder 
 292.89 -Induced Sexual Dysfunction 
 292.89 Intoxication 
 292.81 Intoxication Delirium 
 292.9 -Related Disorder NOS 
 292.0 Withdrawal 
 313.81 Oppositional Defiant Disorder 
 625.8 Other Female Sexual Dysfunction Due to...[Indicate the General Medical Condition] 
 608.89 Other Male Sexual Dysfunction Due to...[Indicate the General Medical Condition] 
 Other (or Unknown) Substance
 305.90 Abuse 
 304.90 Dependence 
 292.89 -Induced Anxiety Disorder 
 292.81 -Induced Delirium 
 292.84 -Induced Mood Disorder 
 292.83 -Induced Persisting Amnestic Disorder 
 292.82 -Induced Persisting Dementia 
 292.11 -Induced Psychotic Disorder, With Delusions 
 292.12 -Induced Psychotic Disorder, With Hallucinations 
 292.89 -Induced Sexual Dysfunction 
 292.89 -Induced Sleep Disorder 
 292.89 Intoxication 
 292.9 -Related Disorder NOS 
 292.0 Withdrawal 
Top

P 
 Pain Disorder
 307.89 Associated With Both Psychological Factors and a General Medical Condition 
 307.80 Associated With Psychological Factors 
 Panic Disorder
 300.21 With Agoraphobia 
 300.01 Without Agoraphobia 
 301.0 Paranoid Personality Disorder 
 302.9 Paraphilia NOS 
 307.47 Parasomnia NOS 
 V61.20 Parent-Child Relational Problem 
 V61.1 Partner Relational Problem 
 312.31 Pathological Gambling 
 302.2 Pedophilia 
 310.1 Personality Change Due to...[Indicate the General Medical Condition] 
 301.9 Personality disorder not otherwise specified 
 299.80 Pervasive Developmental Disorder NOS 
 V62.89 Phase of Life Problem 
 Phencyclidine (or Phencyclidine-Like)
 305.90 Abuse 
 304.90 Dependence 
 292.89 -Induced Anxiety Disorder 
 292.84 -Induced Mood Disorder
 292.11 -Induced Psychotic Disorder, With Delusions 
 292.12 -Induced Psychotic Disorder, With Hallucinations 
 292.89 Intoxication 
 292.81 Intoxication Delirium 
 292.9 -Related Disorder NOS 
 315.39 Phonological Disorder 
 Physical Abuse
 V61.12 Physical Abuse of Adult (if by partner)
 V62.83 Physical Abuse of Adult (if by person other than partner)
 995.81 Physical Abuse of Adult (if focus of attention is on victim) 
 V61.21 Physical Abuse of Child 
 995.54 Physical Abuse of Child (if focus of attention is on victim) 
 307.52 Pica 
 304.80 Polysubstance Dependence 
 309.81 Posttraumatic Stress Disorder 
 302.75 Premature Ejaculation 
 307.44 Primary Hypersomnia 
 307.42 Primary Insomnia 
 318.2 Profound Mental Retardation 
 316 Psychological Factors Affecting Medical Condition 
 Psychotic Disorder Due to...[Indicate the General Medical Condition]
 293.81 With Delusions 
 293.82 With Hallucinations 
 298.9 Psychotic disorder NOS
 312.33 Pyromania 
Top

R 

 313.89 Reactive Attachment Disorder of Infancy or Early Childhood 
 315.00 Reading Disorder 
 Relational Problem
 V62.81 Relational Problem NOS 
 V61.9 Relational Problem Related to a Mental Disorder or General Medical Condition 
 V62.89 Religious or Spiritual Problem 
 299.80 Rett's Disorder 
 307.53 Rumination Disorder 
Top

S 

 295.70 Schizoaffective Disorder 
 301.20 Schizoid Personality Disorder 
 Schizophrenia
 295.20 Catatonic Type 
 295.10 Disorganized Type 
 295.30 Paranoid Type 
 295.60 Residual Type 
 295.90 Undifferentiated Type 
 295.40 Schizophreniform Disorder 
 301.22 Schizotypal Personality Disorder 
 Sedative, Hypnotic, or Anxiolytic
 305.40 Abuse 
 304.10 Dependence 
 292.89 -Induced Anxiety Disorder 
 292.84 -Induced Mood Disorder 
 292.83 -Induced Persisting Amnestic Disorder 
 292.82 -Induced Persisting Dementia 
 292.11 -Induced Psychotic Disorder, With Delusions 
 292.12 -Induced Psychotic Disorder, With Hallucinations 
 292.89 -Induced Sexual Dysfunction 
 292.89 -Induced Sleep Disorder 
 292.89 Intoxication 
 292.81 Intoxication Delirium 
 292.9 -Related Disorder NOS 
 292.0 Withdrawal 
 292.81 Withdrawal Delirium 
 313.23 Selective Mutism 
 309.21 Separation Anxiety Disorder 
 318.1 Severe Mental Retardation 
 Sexual Abuse
 V61.12 Sexual Abuse of Adult (if by partner)
 V62.83 Sexual Abuse of Adult (if by person other than partner)
 995.83 Sexual Abuse of Adult (if focus of attention is on victim) 
 V61.21 Sexual Abuse of Child 
 995.53 Sexual Abuse of Child (if focus of attention is on victim) 
 302.79 Sexual Aversion Disorder 
 302.9 Sexual Disorder NOS 
 302.70 Sexual Dysfunction NOS 
 302.83 Sexual Masochism 
 302.84 Sexual Sadism 
 297.3 Shared Psychotic Disorder 
 V61.8 Sibling Relational Problem 
 Sleep Disorder
 Sleep Disorder Due to...[Indicate the General Medical Condition]
 780.54 Hypersomnia Type 
 780.52 Insomnia Type 
 780.59 Mixed Type 
 780.59 Parasomnia Type 
 307.46 Sleep Terror Disorder 
 307.46 Sleepwalking Disorder 
 300.23 Social Phobia 
 300.81 Somatization Disorder 
 300.82 Somatoform Disorder NOS 
 300.29 Specific Phobia 
 307.3 Stereotypic Movement Disorder 
 307.0 Stuttering 
Top

T 
 307.20 Tic Disorder NOS 
 307.23 Tourette's Disorder 
 307.21 Transient Tic Disorder 
 302.3 Transvestic Fetishism 
 312.39 Trichotillomania 
Top

U 
 300.82 Undifferentiated Somatoform Disorder 
 300.9 Unspecified Mental Disorder (nonpsychotic) 
Top

V 
 306.51 Vaginismus (Not Due to a General Medical Condition)
 Vascular Dementia
 290.40 Uncomplicated
 290.41 With Delirium 
 290.42 With Delusions 
 290.43 With Depressed Mood 
 302.82 Voyeurism
Top

Diagnostic and Statistical Manual of Mental Disorders